Philosophers born in the 15th and 16th centuries (and others important in the history of philosophy), listed alphabetically:

Note: This list has a minimal criterion for inclusion and the relevance to philosophy of some individuals on the list is disputed.

A-B
Isaac ben Judah Abravanel, (1437–1508)
Judah ben Isaac Abravanel, (c. 1460–c. 1535)
Alessandro Achillini, (1463–1512)
Uriel Acosta, (1585–1640)
Rodolphus Agricola, (1443–1485)
Heinrich Cornelius Agrippa, (1436–1535)*
Leone Battista Alberti, (1404–1472)
Yohanan ben Isaac Alemanno, (1433–1504)
Isaac ben Moses Arama, (1420–1494)
Jacobus Arminius, (1560–1609)
Francis Bacon, (1561–1626)12
Domingo Báñez, (1528–1604)
Sebastiano Basso, (16th century)
Gabriel Biel, (1425–1495)
Jean Bodin, (1530–1596)12
Jakob Böhme, (1575–1624)
Giovanni Botero, (c. 1544–1617)
Giordano Bruno, (1548–1600)12*

C-E
Thomas Cajetan, (1469–1534)12
John Calvin, (1509–1564)2
Tommaso Campanella, (1568–1639)12
Gerolamo Cardano, (1501–1576)
Andrea Cesalpino, (1519–1603)
Chaitanya Mahaprabhu, (1486–1534)
Pierre Charron, (1541–1603)
Ch'en Hsien-chang, (1428–1500)
Chiao Hung, (1540–1620)
John Comenius, (1592–1670)12
Nicolaus Copernicus, (1473–1543)12
Johannes Crellius, (1590–1633)
Cesare Cremonini, (1550–1631)
Jalal al-Din al-Dawani, (1426–1502)
Elijah Delmedigo, (1460–1497)
Joseph Solomon Delmedigo, (1484–1558)
Denys the Carthusian (or Denys de Leeuwis), (1402–1471)
René Descartes, (1596–1650)12
Guillaume du Vair, (1556–1621)
Desiderius Erasmus, (1466–1536)12

F-K
Marsilio Ficino, (1433–1499)12*
Robert Filmer, (1588–1653)12
Robert Fludd, (1574–1637)
Pedro da Fonseca, (1528–1599)
Fujiwara Seika, (1561–1619)
Galileo Galilei, (1564–1642)12
Pierre Gassendi, (1592–1655)12
Rudolph Goclenius, (1547–1628)
Wawrzyniec Grzymala Goslicki (1530–1607)
Hugo Grotius, (1583–1645)12
Henricus Regius, (1598–1679)
Edward Herbert, 1st Baron Herbert of Cherbury, (1583–1648)
Abraham Cohen de Herrera (or Alonso Nunez de Herrera or Abraham Irira), (1562–1635)
Thomas Hobbes, (1588–1679)12
Richard Hooker, (1554–1600)
John of St. Thomas (or Jean Poinsot), (1589–1644)
Joachim Jungius, (1587–1657)
Bartholomäus Keckermann, (1571–1609)
Johannes Kepler, (1571–1630)*

L-O
Isaac La Peyrère, (1596–1676)
Justus Lipsius, (1547–1606)
Liu Tsung-chou (or Ch'i-shan), (1578–1645)
Martin Luther, (1483–1546)12
Niccolò Machiavelli, (1469–1527)12
John Major (or John Mair), (1467–1550)12
Juan de Mariana, (1536–1624)
Jacopo Mazzoni, (1548–1598)
Bartolomé de Medina, (1527–1580)
Philipp Melanchthon, (1497–1560)
Marin Mersenne, (1588–1648)
Judah Messer Leon, (c. 1425 – c. 1495)
Mikyo Dorje (or Mi bskyod rdo rje), (1507–1554)
Muhammad Baqir Mir Damad (or Sayyid al-Afadil or Ishraq or Ibn al-Damad), (died 1631)
Luis de Molina, (1535–1600)12
Michel de Montaigne, (1533–1592)12
Thomas More, (1478–1535)*
Mulla Sadra, (1571–1640)12
Nicholas of Cusa, (1401–1464)12*
Agostino Nifo, (1470–1538)
Richard Overton, (c. 1599 – 1664)

P-T
Paracelsus, (1493–1541)
Francesco Patrizi da Cherso (or Franciscus Patritius) (1529–1597)
Giovanni Pico della Mirandola, (1463–1494)12*
Pietro Pomponazzi, (1462–1525)12
François Rabelais, (1493–1553)
Petrus Ramus, (1515–1572)
Raghunatha Siromani, (c. 1477–1547)
Francisco Sanches, (1551–1623)
Julius Caesar Scaliger, (1484–1558)
Michal Sedziwój, (1566–1636)
John Selden, (1584–1654)
Francesco Silvestri (or Francis Sylvester of Ferrara), (1474–1528)
Sosan Hyujong, (1520–1604)
Domingo de Soto, (1494–1560)
Francisco Suárez, (1548–1617)12*
Nicolaus Taurellus, (1547–1606)
Bernardino Telesio, (1509–1588)
Teresa of Avila, (1515–1582)
Francisco Toledo, (1532–1596)

V-Z
Lorenzo Valla, (1406–1457)12*
Vallabhacharya, (1479–1531)
Vyasatirtha, (c. 1460–1539)
Lucilio "Giulio Cesare" Vanini, (1585–1619)
Gabriel Vasquez, (1549–1604)
Nicoletto Vernia, (1442–1499)
Francisco de Vitoria, (1492–1546)12
Juan Luís Vives, (1492–1540)
Wang Yangming, (1472–1529)12
Thomas White, (1593–1676)
Yi Hwang (or Toegye) (1501–1570)
Yi I (or Yi Yulgok or Yi Yi) (1536–1584)
Jacopo Zabarella, (1533–1589)

See also
List of philosophers
 List of philosophers born in the centuries BC
 List of philosophers born in the 1st through 10th centuries
 List of philosophers born in the 11th through 14th centuries
 List of philosophers born in the 17th century
 List of philosophers born in the 18th century
 List of philosophers born in the 19th century
 List of philosophers born in the 20th century

Notes and references

15th century-related lists
16th century-related lists
15